Rubin Jenny G. Seigers (born 11 January 1998) is a Belgian professional footballer who plays as a centre-back for Belgian First Division A club Westerlo.

Honours
Genk
Belgian First Division A: 2018–19

Westerlo
 Belgian First Division B: 2021–22

References

External links
 

1998 births
Living people
Belgian footballers
Association football defenders
K.R.C. Genk players
K Beerschot VA players
K.V.C. Westerlo players
Belgian Pro League players
Challenger Pro League players
Belgium youth international footballers